Classical Chinese writers were trained as compilers rather than as originators composing information. These writers in Classical Chinese were trained by memorizing extensive tracts in the classics and histories. Their method of constructing their own work was to extensively cut and paste passages and fragments from these sources. Today this would be called plagiarism. However, these early Chinese writers considered themselves not as creators, but as preservers of the record. The continuing controversy over the meaning of Chinese text is best understood by examining the classical scholar's way of writing. Zhu Xi was a great editor and commentator but his prime aim was moral learning, considered far more important than art or literature. Zhu Xi cemented Confucian moral righteousness into the Chinese methods of evaluation. Joseph Needham has said, Chinese writers made careful note of observable concrete phenomena but they made little use of categorical analysis or the building of logical systems.

Footnotes

Chinese culture